Troy Mangen (born July 25, 1994) is an American football tight end who is currently a free agent. He played college football at Ohio Bobcats. Mangen started all four years at Ohio as a tight end. He finished his senior year with 13 catches for 139 yards and had two touchdowns. He signed with the Falcons as an undrafted free agent in 2018.

Professional career
Mangen signed with the Atlanta Falcons as an undrafted free agent on May 1, 2018. He was waived on September 1, 2018.

References

1994 births
Living people
American football tight ends
Ohio Bobcats football players
Atlanta Falcons players